Fairfield is an eastern suburb of Lower Hutt, New Zealand, situated in the south of the North Island of New Zealand.

Education

Notable residents
Montague Ongley

Community 
The Common Unity Project Aotearoa located at 310 Waiwhetu Road was founded in 2012 by Julia Milne based on a philosophy of strengthening the community through collaboration.

Epuni Boys Home 
Epuni Boys Home was opened on 29 January 1959 at 441 Riverside Drive as a state-run home for "troubled' boys aged between eight and 17. It closed in February 1990. Numerous allegations of physical and sexual abuse have been made by former residents during their time at the Home and these are among allegations under examination by the Royal Commission of Enquiry into State Care.

References

Further Reading 
Fairfield, formerly the hamlet of Epuni in the city of Lower Hutt, Peters, Edna, Lower Hutt, N.Z. New Zealand Country Women's Institute, 1990, Unpublished manuscript. NLNZ ALMA 995119123502836.

A history of the Epuni School compiled by Lance Hall, a pupil of the school from 1904, and added to by headmasters since 1953.  (NLNZ ALMA 99993263502836)

Common Unity website: https://www.commonunityproject.org.nz/

Suburbs of Lower Hutt